Parliamentary elections were held in Austria on 18 November 1962. The result was a victory for the Austrian People's Party, which won 81 of the 165 seats. Voter turnout was 94%.  Although the People's Party had come up only two seats short of an outright majority, Chancellor Alfons Gorbach (who had succeeded Julius Raab a year earlier) retained the grand coalition with the Socialists under Vice-Chancellor Bruno Pittermann.

Results

References

Elections in Austria
Austria
Legislative
Austria